The Sesame Street Monsters! A Musical Monster-Osity is an album made by the monsters from Sesame Street in 1975.

Track listing
Side One
 The Lovable Monsters of Sesame Street — The Monsters of Sesame Street (featuring Grover, Herry Monster, Frazzle and Cookie Monster)
 I, Grover — Grover
 Five Monsters in My Family — The Monsters of Sesame Street
 I Can't Help It — Herry Monster
 I Want a Monster to Be My Friend — A Little Girl
 Frazzle — Frazzle and the Frazzletones

Side Two
 We'll Do It Together — Cookie Monster, Herry Monster and Grover
 Fur — A Maroon-and-Yellow Monster
 Cookie's Rhyming Song — Cookie Monster
 Monster Lullaby — A Monster and Her Monster Son
 Games Monsters Play — Herry Monster and Grover
 Be Kind to Your Neighborhood Monsters — Grover and the Monsters of Sesame Street

Cast
Frank Oz as Cookie Monster and Grover
Jerry Nelson as Herry Monster, Frazzle and Monster Son
Richard Hunt as A Maroon-and-Yellow Monster, Monster Son and Monster Sister
Marilyn Sokol as A Little Girl and A Mommy Monster
Fran Brill as Monster Sister
Jim Henson  as Monster Father
Christopher Cerf, Richard Hunt and Jerry Nelson as The Frazzletones

Sesame Street albums
1975 albums